Daybreak (Hangul: 데이브레이크) is a South Korean band formed in 2007. They debuted on September 18, 2007, with Urban Life Style.

Daybreak are part of the lineup for the Grand Mint Festival 2020 which is scheduled to take place on October 24–25, 2020 at Olympic Park in Seoul, South Korea.

Members
Lee Won-suk (이원석) — Vocals
Jung Yu-jong (정유종) — Guitar
Kim Sun-il (김선일) — Bass
Kim Jang-won (김장원) — Keyboard
Hong Jun (홍준) — Drums (Guest member)

Discography

Studio albums

Live albums

Extended plays

Singles

Collaborations

Soundtrack appearances

References

South Korean musical groups
Musical groups from Seoul
Musical groups established in 2007
2007 establishments in South Korea